is an airline headquartered on the grounds of Nagasaki Airport and in Ōmura, Nagasaki Prefecture, Japan. It operates in southern Japan, offering charter services and a scheduled service between Nagasaki and Fukuoka. Its main base is Nagasaki Airport, with a hub at Fukuoka Airport. The airline was established in 1961 as Nagasaki Airways. It was renamed Oriental Air Bridge in March 2001.

Destinations 

Oriental Air Bridge serves the following destinations (as of January 2023):

Fleet

Current fleet

The Oriental Air Bridge fleet consists of the following aircraft (as of January 2023):

Former fleet
Oriental Air Bridge has also operated the following aircraft in the past (as of October 2018): 
1 Bombardier Dash 8 Q100
1 Britten-Norman BN2B-20 Islander

References

External links

Official website 

Airlines of Japan
Regional airlines of Japan
Airlines established in 2001
Companies based in Nagasaki Prefecture